The women's 100m freestyle S11 event at the 2012 Summer Paralympics took place at the  London Aquatics Centre on 31 August. There were three heats; the swimmers with the eight fastest times advanced to the final.

Results

Heats
Competed from 10:54.

Heat 1

Heat 2

Heat 3

Final
Competed at 19:09.

 
'Q = qualified for final. WR = World Record. AM = Americas Record. AF = African Record. OC = Oceania Record.

References
Official London 2012 Paralympics Results: Heats 
Official London 2012 Paralympics Results: Final 

Swimming at the 2012 Summer Paralympics
2012 in women's swimming